Tamzin Merchant (born 4 March 1987) is an English actress and author, best known for her roles as Georgiana Darcy in the film Pride & Prejudice (2005), as Catherine Howard in the Showtime series The Tudors (2009–2010) and as Anne Hale in the WGN America series Salem (2014–2017). She wrote the 2021 children's book The Hatmakers.

Early life
Merchant's family is from Sussex, England. She was educated at Windlesham House School and Brighton College, although she has also lived in Dubai, United Arab Emirates. After twice deferring university places to concentrate on her acting career, she eventually studied English and Drama with Education at Homerton College, Cambridge.

Career
Merchant's early credits include Margo Durrell in the 2005 BBC television film My Family and Other Animals. In 2006 she appeared in two more BBC dramas, as Sara Fox, the daughter of Alan Davies and Michelle Gomez, in the comedy The Good Housekeeping Guide, and as Probationer Eastwood in the historical drama Casualty 1906.

In 2007, while studying at the University of Cambridge, she performed in an audio production of Lady Windermere's Fan as Lady Agatha, while in 2008 she appeared in the ensemble drama Radio Cape Cod in which she plays a summer theatre camper.

She appears in the music video for Jamie T's "If You've Got The Money" and in Belle and Sebastian's "Nobody's Empire".

She was cast in the third season (2009) of The Tudors, playing Catherine Howard, the fifth wife of Henry VIII. She debuted in the part in the third-season finale and features heavily in several episodes of the fourth (and final) season.

Merchant played Daenerys Targaryen in the unaired pilot of the HBO series Game of Thrones, based on George R. R. Martin's A Song of Ice and Fire series of fantasy novels. The pilot was poorly received, and as a result the first episode was completely remade. Merchant was replaced in her role as Daenerys by Emilia Clarke.

She has also starred in DCI Banks: 'Playing with Fire' as Miranda. In early 2012, Merchant played the 17-year-old Rosa Bud in the BBC adaptation of Charles Dickens' The Mystery of Edwin Drood, written by Gwyneth Hughes.

Merchant was a series regular for 3 seasons of Salem on WGN America from 2014 to 2017.

In 2019 Merchant was cast as a series regular on the Amazon Prime series Carnival Row. The series premiered on 30 August and was renewed for a second season.

Philanthropy
Merchant is a patron of the international development charity Build Africa.

Filmography

Film

Television

Music videos

Stage

References

External links

 
 

Actresses from Sussex
British film actresses
British television actresses
People educated at Brighton College
Alumni of Homerton College, Cambridge
1987 births
Living people
21st-century British actresses
People educated at Windlesham House School
21st-century English women
21st-century English people